Ismael Jorge Balea (born 27 January 1993 in Uruguay) is a Uruguayan footballer who now plays for Ansan Greeners in South Korea.

Career

Balea started his senior career with Rayo Vallecano. After that, he played for AD Villaviciosa de Odón, CDA Navalcarnero, Alcobendas CF, Real Ávila CF, and CA Pinto. In 2020, he signed for Ansan Greeners in the South Korean K League 2, where he made three league appearances and scored zero goals.

References

External links
 Ismael Jorge Balea: "I left the football for six months after returning to Spain..."
 Isma Jorge: "My adventure in Korean football finally begins"
 Ismael Jorge Balea: "They ask for all your data, down to body temperature..."
 

1993 births
Uruguayan footballers
Uruguayan expatriate footballers
Expatriate footballers in South Korea
Association football midfielders
Rayo Vallecano B players
Ansan Greeners FC players
Living people